Eighty-six or 86 is American English slang used to indicate that an item is no longer available, traditionally from a food or drinks establishment, or referring to a person or people who are not welcome in the premises. Its etymology is unknown but seems to have been coined in the 1920s or 1930s.

The term is now more generally used to mean getting rid of someone or something. In the 1970s, its meaning expanded to refer to murder.

Etymology and meanings 

The term eighty-six was initially used in restaurants and bars according to most late twentieth-century American slang dictionaries. It is often used in food and drink services to indicate that an item is no longer available or that a customer should be ejected. Beyond this context, it is generally used with the meaning to 'get rid of' someone or something.

According to the online Merriam-Webster dictionary, it means to "refuse to serve (a customer)", to "get rid of" or "throw out" someone or something.

According to the Oxford English Dictionary, it may be used as a noun or verb. As a noun, "In restaurants and bars, an expression indicating that the supply of an item is exhausted, or that a customer is not to be served; also, a customer to be refused service. Also transferred." As a transitive verb derived from the noun, it means "to eject or debar (a person) from premises; to reject or abandon". The OED gives examples of usage from 1933 to 1981. For example, from The Candidate, in which the media adviser said to Robert Redford, "OK, now, for starters, we got to cut your hair and eighty-six the sideburns".

According to Cassell's Dictionary of Slang, the meaning expanded during the 1970s to also mean "to kill, to murder; to execute judicially". This usage was derived from the slang term used in restaurants. Other slang dictionaries confirm this definition.

There are many theories about the origin of the term but none are certain. It seems to have originated in the 1920s or 1930s. Possible origins include:
 Rhyming slang for nix.
 Part of the jargon used by soda jerks. Walter Winchell wrote about this in 1933, in his syndicated On Broadway column. In this, the code 13 meant that a boss was around, 81 was a glass of water and 86 meant "all out of it". Professor Harold Bentley of Columbia University studied soda jerk jargon and reported other numeric codes such as 95 for a customer leaving without paying.
 Author Jef Klein theorized that the bar Chumley's at 86 Bedford Street in the West Village of Lower Manhattan was the source. His book The History and Stories of the Best Bars of New York claims that the police would call Chumley's bar during prohibition before making a raid and tell the bartender to "86" his customers, meaning that they should exit out the 86 Bedford Street door, while the police would come to the Pamela Court entrance.

Notable uses

Music
 The 1947 song "Boogie Woogie Blue Plate", by Louis Jordan and his Tympany Five, uses soda-jerk lingo, among which is "86 on the cherry pie".
 The 1995 song "86" by Green Day is about them being rejected from their punk rock community when they started achieving commercial success.
 The 2015 song "The Remedy" by Puscifer uses the termonology "Trolls get 86s" from the house if you don't respect its rules.
The cover art for Eagles' 1980 live album Eagles Live features a stenciled version of the number on both sides. At the time, Eagles were on the verge of breaking up.

Stage and screen
 During a Nick Cage's character visit to a bar in the movie "Leaving Las Vegas", he promised the bartender that if he only serve him one more drink he will never be back again, or the bartender can "86" him.
 Agent 86 in the 1960s TV show Get Smart gets his code number from the term.
 Numbuh 86 from the 2000s Cartoon Network show Codename: Kids Next Door gets her "numbuh" from this term due to her job of "decommissioning" Kids Next Door operatives who have reached the age of 13 and become teenagers.
 During the song "Feed Me (Git It!)" from Little Shop of Horrors, as "Audrey II", the plant, tempts Seymour Krelborn with offers of fortune and luxuries if he continues to feed it blood, the plant utters, "There must be someone you could 86, real quiet-like, and get me some lunch!"
 The 2018 comedy crime film 86'd by Alan Palomo depicts five stories taking place at a 24-hour deli with a theme song composed under his Neon Indian moniker.
 In the movie Fury Brad Pitt's character says "the radio is 86" after it gets destroyed in a battle with a German Tiger tank.
 In season 7, episode 8 of the TV show "The Mentalist" (ca 3:15), Simon Baker's character says "86 the wings" when he needs to cancel the chicken wings to go he just ordered.
 In The Princess Diaries, Anne Hathaway's character asks if they can "86 the flags" on the limousine.

Literature
 The 1989 novel Eighty-sixed by David B. Feinberg refers to "the gay community wiped out by AIDS". It won Feinberg the Lambda Literary Award for Gay Men's Fiction and the American Library Association Gay/Lesbian Award for Fiction.
 The 2009 novel 86'd by Dan Fante is loosely based on his own struggles with alcoholism and substance abuse.
 In the Japanese novel 86 -Eighty Six- by Asato Asato, the Eighty-Six are people whose rights were taken away and relegated into internment camps in the unofficial 86th District, treated as sub-human, and forced to fight in the war.

See also
 23 skidoo
 Deep Six (disambiguation)
 Diner lingo

References

External links

American slang
Restaurant terminology
Jargon